Absalom Dlamini (born 5 August 1984) is a Swazi footballer with the Royal Leopards and the Swaziland national football team. He plays on position of defensive midfielder.

References

External links
 

1984 births
Living people
Swazi footballers
Eswatini international footballers
Royal Leopards F.C. players
Association football midfielders
Swazi sportsmen